Tacoma Arts Live is a 501(c)(3) non-profit organization located in the Tacoma Armory of downtown Tacoma, Washington. Tacoma Arts Live Conservatory and Education Department provide one of the largest performing arts education programs in Washington state.

Since 1918, Tacoma Arts Live has been host to many famous figures and world-class artists such as Franklin D. Roosevelt, Babe Ruth, Ronald Reagan, Hal Holbrook, Debbie Reynolds, Martin Short, Queen Latifah, Joan Rivers, Wanda Sykes and Colleen Ballinger/Miranda Sings.

Artists, performers and premieres

1920s
Mae West
The Marx Brothers
Franklin D. Roosevelt
Harry Houdini
Bob Hope
Babe Ruth
Gene Tunney

1930s
King Kong
Scarface
Mutiny on the Bounty
Top Hat
Modern Times
Gone with the Wind
The Wizard of Oz

1940s
Ronald Reagan
Jack Benny
Hellzapoppin
Jack Dempsey

1980s
Victor Borge
Diane Schuur
Marcel Marceau
Dizzie Gillespie
Hal Holbrook
Mark Russell
Myron Floren
Itzhak Perlman
Nikolai Arnoldovich Petrov
Glenn Miller Orchestra

1990s
Alvin Ailey
Bill Maher
Dave Barry
Marvin Hamlisch
Victor Borge
Wynton Marsalis
Chick Corea
Gregory Peck
Debbie Reynolds

2000s
Bob Newhart
Blind Boys of Alabama
David Sedaris
Garrison Keillor
Martin Short
Omara Portuondo
Queen Latifah
Doc Watson
Randy Newman
Treasure Island
Sleeping Beauty
My Fair Lady
Caution: Men at Work
RENT
Grease 
Ricky Skaggs
Fiddler on the Roof
Spectrum Dance Co
Joan Baez
The Spencer's Theatre of Illusion
Josh Blue
Rush Limbaugh in Night School
Billy Joel and Twyla Tharp's Movin' Out
An Evening with Randy Cohen
Young King Arthur
Magic School Bus
Doyle's Cabaret
Footloose
James & Giant Peach
Chicago
PHANTOM
Ballet Folklorico
Mick Maloney
Newport Jazz 2002
Forbidden Broadway
Cinderella
Sleeping Beauty
Capitol Steps
South Sound Slam
Peking Acrobats
Yesterday: Beatles
Les Ballet Africains
The Sound of Music
Ballet Folklorico de Mexico
Seattle Men's Chorus
Ira Glass
Dave Barry
Guess How Much I Love You
Big Bad Voodoo Daddy
Tap Dogs
Hawaiian Slack Key
Soweto Gospel Choir
Urban Cowboy: The Musical
Out of Mist…A Dragon
Shanghai Acrobats
Gilbert & Sullivan's The Pirates of Penzance 
If You Give a Mouse a Cookie
Sophisticated Ladies
Lee Greenwood
Pink Floyd Experience
Nobodies of Comedy
Mad Science: Newton's Revenge
Operation Homecoming
Peter Yarrow with Bethany and Rufus
Lavay Smith and Her Red Hot Skillet Lickers
Defending the Caveman
Strut Your Mutt
Sierra Leone's Refugee All Stars
Peter Pan: The High Flying Musical
Pine Leaf Boys
Highland Heath & Holler
The Wonder Bread Years
Four Slices of Wry
Cirqueworks Birdhouse Factory
Ragamala Music & Dance Theater
Dying To Be Thin
The Acting Company (The Tempest/Moby Dick "Rehearsed")
Not a Genuine Black Man
Garrison Keillor
Acia Gray & Tapestry Dance Company's Souls of Our Feet
Show Way
Woven Harmony
3 Redneck Tenors: A New Musical Adventure
An Afternoon of Classic Lily Tomlin
Wilson's Joe Turner's Come and Gone
Do Jump!: Aerial Dance
Altar Boyz
Judy Collins with Tacoma Symphony Orchestra & Jonatha Brooke
Book-It Repertory Theatre's Even Cowgirls Get the Blues
An Evening with David Sedaris
An Evening with Martin Short
Scrooge: The Movie Musical

2010s
Joan Rivers
Wanda Sykes
Ira Glass
Ladysmith Black Mambazo
Gaelic Storm
Smothers Brothers
Jo Dee Messina
Margaret Cho
August Wilson's Seven Guitars
Nanci Griffith
Sweeney Todd: A Musical Thriller in Concert
Oregon Shakespeare Festival
Wayne Brady
Video Games Live
Colleen Ballinger/Miranda Sings

References
HistoryLink.org
Pantages History
City of Tacoma
Theatre Puget Sound
Official Website

Buildings and structures in Tacoma, Washington
Theatres in Washington (state)
Tourist attractions in Tacoma, Washington
Performing arts centers in Washington (state)